Benjamin Franklin Burch (May 2, 1825 – March 24, 1893) was an American farmer, soldier, and politician in what became the state of Oregon. A native of Missouri, he moved to the Oregon Country in 1845 and served in the Cayuse and Yakima wars. A Democrat, he represented Polk County at the Oregon Constitutional Convention, in the Oregon House of Representatives, and in the Oregon State Senate including one session as President of the Senate.

Early life
Benjamin Burch was born in Chariton County, Missouri, on May 2, 1825, to Samuel Burch and Eleanor (née Lock) Burch. In 1845, he crossed the Great Plains on the Oregon Trail bound for the Oregon Country. He settled in what became Polk County in the Willamette Valley of Oregon.

Crafting the Oregon Constitution: Biographical Sketch of Benjamin F. Burch Oregon State Archives. 2009. Retrieved on June 20, 2016.</ref> At the time it was under the authority of the Provisional Government of Oregon, and in 1848 became the Oregon Territory. In 1846, he helped Jesse Applegate and Levi Scott build the Applegate Trail, a route to the valley through Southern Oregon.

Burch then returned to his home where he had tutored Applegate's children before becoming a teacher at the first school in the county. After the breakout of the Cayuse War in 1847, he volunteered for the militia and served as an adjutant. Following the war, on September 6, 1848, he married Kentucky native Eliza A. Davidson who had immigrated to Oregon from Illinois the year before. They had seven children, including Benjamin, Jr. During the Yakima War in 1856 Burch served as a captain of a company of militia.

Political career
In 1857, he was elected to represent Polk County in the Oregon Constitutional Convention held in Oregon in August and September. At the convention he was part of a special committee with James K. Kelly and La Fayette Grover that designed the Oregon State Seal. Burch was also a member of the Military Affairs Committee. In 1858, he was elected to the first session of the state legislature as a Democrat representing Polk County in the Oregon House of Representatives. Oregon was still waiting to be admitted to the Union, and the legislature did not officially convene until 1859.

Burch remained out of politics until 1868 when he was elected to the Oregon State Senate. He represented Polk County as a Democrat during a four-year term. During the 1868 legislature he served as President of the Senate.

Later years
In 1877, he became the Superintendent of the Oregon State Penitentiary in Salem by appointment of Governor Stephen F. Chadwick, serving two terms. He was appointed as the receiver at the Oregon City Land Office in 1887 by President Grover Cleveland. Benjamin Franklin Burch died on March 24, 1893, at the age of 67 at his farm near Independence.

References

Members of the Oregon Constitutional Convention
Democratic Party members of the Oregon House of Representatives
Presidents of the Oregon State Senate
Democratic Party Oregon state senators
People from Chariton County, Missouri
People from Independence, Oregon
Cayuse War
1825 births
1893 deaths
Oregon pioneers
19th-century American politicians